The 3rd constituency of the Loiret (French: Troisième circonscription du Loiret) is a French legislative constituency in the Loiret département. Like the other 576 French constituencies, it elects one MP using a two round electoral system.

Description

The 3rd Constituency of the Loiret lies in the south of the department covering a largely rural area including the town of Sully-sur-Loire upstream on the Loire from Orléans.

With the exception of the 1988 this constituency has continually supported candidates from the centre right. At the 2017 election incumbent Claude de Ganay held off the En Marche! surge by just 59 votes. However, the seat was gained by the far-right RN in 2022.

Assembly Members

Election results

2022

 
 
|-
| colspan="8" bgcolor="#E9E9E9"|
|-

2017

 
 
 
 
 
 
|-
| colspan="8" bgcolor="#E9E9E9"|
|-

2012

 
 
 
 
 
|-
| colspan="8" bgcolor="#E9E9E9"|
|-

References

3